Divyamani (pronounced , meaning the divine gem) is a rāgam in the 72 melakarta rāgam system of Carnatic music. It is the 48th in the series. It is called Jeevantika or Jeevantini in Muthuswami Dikshitar school of Carnatic music.

Structure and Lakshana

It is the 6th rāgam in the 8th chakra Vasu. The mnemonic name is Vasu-Sha. The mnemonic phrase is sa ra gi mi pa dhu nu. Its  structure (ascending and descending scale) is as follows (see swaras in Carnatic music for details on below notation and terms):
: 
: 
(the notes used in this scale are shuddha rishabham, sadharana gandharam, prati madhyamam, shatsruthi dhaivatham, kakali nishadham)

As it is a melakarta rāgam, by definition it is a sampoorna rāgam (has all seven notes in ascending and descending scale). It is the prati madhyamam equivalent of Roopavati, which is the 12th melakarta.

Janya rāgams 
Divyamani has a few minor janya rāgams (derived scales) associated with it. See List of janya rāgams for all rāgams associated with Divyamani.

Compositions
A few compositions set to Divyamani are:

Leela ganu joochi by Thyagaraja
Appa muruga by Koteeswara Iyer

Related rāgams
This section covers the theoretical and scientific aspect of this rāgam.

Divyamani's notes when shifted using Graha bhedam, yields no other melakarta rāgam.

Notes

References

Melakarta ragas